Peter Lindgren (born March 6, 1973) is a Swedish musician and songwriter. He is best known as the former guitarist of Swedish progressive death metal band Opeth.

Musical career
Lindgren joined Opeth in 1991 as bassist for a show, but ended up switched to guitars. As explained in "The Making of Deliverance and Damnation" on Opeth's live DVD Lamentations, lead-playing duties were based on ease of Mikael Åkerfeldt's vocal delivery and which of the two might want a given solo more. If Åkerfeldt was having trouble with a solo, he would hand it over to Lindgren, and vice versa. In March 2004, Peter and Mikael Åkerfeldt were both ranked #42 out of the 100 Greatest Heavy Metal Guitarists of all time by Guitar World.

Throughout his career in Opeth, Lindgren has co-written the music for several songs along with Mikael Åkerfeldt, such as "Black Rose Immortal" from Morningrise, "Demon of the Fall" from My Arms, Your Hearse as well as "Dirge for November" and "Blackwater Park" from Blackwater Park.

In May 2007, Peter Lindgren announced that he had left Opeth due to the rigors of life on the road as a touring musician and that he had lost his enthusiasm for playing in Opeth. Both Lindgren and Åkerfeldt said that the split was amicable. Lindgren was since replaced by Fredrik Åkesson.

Personal life
Lindgren holds degrees in engineering physics at KTH Royal Institute of Technology and literature at Stockholm University. Since his departure from Opeth, Lindgren was working as an IT consultant and senior manager in Stockholm and has so far stayed out of public eye.

Influences
Lindgren became a musician after growing up listening to the band Iron Maiden and was also heavily influenced by the Metallica album Master of Puppets. He was introduced to '70s progressive rock by listening to the band Camel, one of the influences on Opeth's progressive style.

Equipment
Guitars
PRS Custom 24
Gibson Les Paul Custom 1974
Jackson Randy Rhoads
1991 Gibson SG

Amplification
Laney VH100R (His amplifier settings/eq were almost exactly like Åkerfeldt's during live performances)

Effects
BOSS GT-5 effect processor

References

Swedish heavy metal guitarists
Opeth members
Lead guitarists
Living people
1973 births
Rhythm guitarists
Stockholm University alumni
Steel (band) members